"Rebel Yell" is a song by English-American rock musician Billy Idol. It is the title track of his 1983 album of the same name, and was released as the album's lead single in October 1983. Although it charted outside the UK Top 40, a 1985 re-issue peaked at no. 6, and it reached no. 46 in the US. The song received wide critical acclaim and in 2009 was named the 79th best hard rock song of all time by VH1 based on a public vote.

Composition and lyrics
At a televised performance of VH1 Storytellers, Idol said that he had attended an event where Mick Jagger, Keith Richards, and Ronnie Wood of The Rolling Stones were taking swigs from a bottle of "Rebel Yell" bourbon whiskey. He was not familiar with the brand, but he liked the name and decided to write the song.

The song was co-written by guitarist Steve Stevens. The instrumental introduction, which sounds like a combination of electric guitar and electronic keyboard, is performed by Stevens on guitar alone, who intended it to sound this way. Stevens states that he was inspired by acoustic guitarist Leo Kottke's style.

Reception
In 1984, music magazine Cash Box wrote that the song "combines the tough swagger and high-powered drive of 'White Wedding' with the decadent dance focus of 'Dancing With Myself.'"

Formats and track listings
UK 7" vinyl single
"Rebel Yell"
"Crank Call"
UK 12" vinyl single
"Rebel Yell"
"Crank Call"
"White Wedding"

(1985 re-issue) UK 7" vinyl single
"Rebel Yell"
"(Do Not) Stand in the Shadows♱"
♱Recorded live at Hollywood Palladium Los Angeles, California, March 1984.
(1985 re-issue) UK 12" vinyl single
"Rebel Yell (Extended Version)"
"(Do Not) Stand in the Shadows♱"
"Blue Highway♱"
♱Recorded live at Hollywood Palladium Los Angeles, California, March 1984.

Charts

Weekly charts

Notes:
1 – Original release in 1984
2 – Re-release in 1985

Year-end charts

Acoustic version

In 1994 Idol released the single "Speed", a song from the box office hit movie of the same name, with a live acoustic version of "Rebel Yell" accompanying the lead song on the UK CD single release.

In popular culture
"Rebel Yell" has been covered by many different bands such as Children of Bodom, HIM, Drowning Pool, Dope, Black Veil Brides, Adrenaline Mob, Bullets and Octane, Otherwise, Blue Stahli, and Queensrÿche.

Live versions

Idol performed the track with Miley Cyrus at the 2016 iHeart Festival.

Scooter cover

In 1996, the song was covered by German dance band Scooter. It was released in May 1996 as the third single of their second album, Our Happy Hardcore.

Track listings
CD-maxi – Germany
 "Rebel Yell" (Radio Edit) (3:40)
 "Rebel Yell" (Extended Mix) (4:44)
 "Euphoria" (3:57)

 12-inch-maxi – Germany
 "Rebel Yell" (Extended Mix) (4:44)
 "Stuttgart (4:52)
 "Euphoria" (3:57)

Cassette single - Germany
 "Rebel Yell" (Radio Edit) (3:40)
 "Euphoria" (3:57)

 CD-single – France
 "Rebel Yell" (Radio Edit) (3:40)
 "Euphoria" (3:57)

12-maxi – France
 "Rebel Yell" (Extended Mix) (4:44)
 "Rebel Yell" (Radio Edit) (3:40)
 "Euphoria" (3:57)

CD-maxi – Australia
 "Rebel Yell" (Radio Edit) (3:40)
 "Let Me Be Your Valentine" (Edit) (3:47)
 "Rebel Yell" (Extended mix) (4:44)
 "Euphoria" (3:57)
 "Let Me Be Your Valentine" (The Complete Work) (5:42)
 "Eternity" (5:19)
 "Silence of T.1210 MKII" (1:31)

Charts

Weekly charts

Year-end charts

See also
 Rebel yell

References

External links
 1984 live performance Capitol Theatre, NJ
 2016 live performance with Miley Cyrus, iHeartRadio Music Festival, Las Vegas

1983 songs
1984 singles
1996 singles
Billy Idol songs
Chrysalis Records singles
British heavy metal songs
Scooter (band) songs
Songs written by Billy Idol
Songs written by Steve Stevens
Song recordings produced by Keith Forsey